Hard Blowin' , subtitled Live at Sandy's, is a live album by saxophonist Buddy Tate which was recorded at Sandy's Jazz Revival in 1978 and released on the Muse label in 1984.

Reception

The AllMusic review by Scott Yanow stated "This is veteran tenor Buddy Tate's most rewarding album from the engagement and a fine all-around showcase. Accompanied by pianist Ray Bryant, bassist George Duvivier, and drummer Alan Dawson, Tate stretches out on four familiar standards and shows listeners that he really had one of the more distinctive tenor sounds of the swing era. Recommended".

Track listing
 "Sweet Georgia Brown" (Ben Bernie, Maceo Pinkard, Kenneth Casey) – 9:47
 "Summertime" (George Gershwin, DuBose Heyward) – 10:30
 "Undecided" (Charlie Shavers, Sid Robin) – 10:15
 "Body and Soul" (Johnny Green, Edward Heyman, Frank Eyton, Robert Sour) – 8:40

Personnel
Buddy Tate - tenor saxophone
Ray Bryant – piano
George Duvivier – bass
Alan Dawson – drums

References

Muse Records live albums
Buddy Tate live albums
1984 live albums
Albums produced by Bob Porter (record producer)